Jordan Henriquez-Roberts (born August 29, 1989) is an American professional basketball player. He played college basketball for Kansas State University.

Professional career
After going undrafted in the 2013 NBA draft, Henriquez joined the Houston Rockets for the 2013 NBA Summer League. On August 5, 2013, he signed with the Rockets. However, he was later waived by the Rockets on October 4, 2013. In November 2013, he was acquired by the Rio Grande Valley Vipers as an affiliate player.

In July 2014, Henriquez joined the New York Knicks for the 2014 NBA Summer League. On August 22, 2014, he signed with Kataja Basket Club of the Korisliiga. Afterwards, he signed with Science City Jena, where he averaged 11.3 points and 7.7 rebounds in seven games.

The next season, Henriquez signed with the Yokohama B-Corsairs of the Japanese Bj league, where he played 52 games and averaged 14.6 points, 11.7 rebounds, 1.7 assists and 2.1 blocks. In September 2016, he signed with Estudiantes Concordia of the Argentinian LNB, where he played 6 games and averaged 5.7 points and 5.8 rebounds.

In January, 2017, Henriquez signed with Panamanian team Correcaminos de Colón to dispute the FIBA Americas League, playing three games and averaging 6.7 points and 9.3 rebounds. Later he signed with Atlético Aguada of the Uruguayan LUB, where he averaged 10.0 points, 5.0 rebounds and 1.5 blocks in two games.

In February 2017, Henriquez signed with Vietnamese club Saigon Heat of the ASEAN Basketball League.

On November 3, 2017, Henriquez was included in the final roster of Westchester Knicks of the NBA G League.

On April 27, 2018, Henriquez signed with Rayos de Hermosillo of the Mexican CIBACOPA.

The Basketball Tournament
Jordan Henriquez played for Team Purple & Black in the 2018 edition of The Basketball Tournament. He scored seven points and grabbed 10 rebounds in the team's first-round loss to Atlanta Dirty South.

References

External links
NBA D-League Profile
Profile at Eurobasket.com

1989 births
Living people
American expatriate basketball people in Argentina
American expatriate basketball people in Finland
American expatriate basketball people in Germany
American expatriate basketball people in Japan
American expatriate basketball people in Mexico
American expatriate basketball people in Panama
American expatriate basketball people in Uruguay
American men's basketball players
Basketball players from New York (state)
Centers (basketball)
Kansas State Wildcats men's basketball players
People from Baldwin, Nassau County, New York
Power forwards (basketball)
Rayos de Hermosillo players
Rio Grande Valley Vipers players
Saigon Heat players
Science City Jena players
Sportspeople from Nassau County, New York
Westchester Knicks players
Yokohama B-Corsairs players